Janne Juvonen (born 3 October 1994) is a Finnish professional ice hockey goaltender. He is currently playing with HC Ambrì-Piotta in the National League (NL). Juvonen was selected by the Nashville Predators in the 7th round (203rd overall) of the 2013 NHL Entry Draft.

Playing career
Juvonen made his SM-liiga debut playing with Lahti Pelicans during the 2011–12 SM-liiga season. Following the 2017–18 season Juvonen signed with Austrian team HC TWK Innsbruck, however, following ten games with the team he signed with Swedish team Mora IK.

Following Mora IK's relegation to the HockeyAllsvenskan, Juvonen opted to remain in the SHL, signing a two-year contract with newly promoted Leksands IF on 10 May 2019.

Juvonen backstopped Leksands for two seasons before leaving the club as a free agent to sign a two-year contract with Finnish-based club, Jokerit of the KHL, on 5 May 2021.

On 5 November 2022 he was selected best player in the game of the Swiss National League SC Rapperswil Jona vs. HC Ambrì Piotta. The present for best player was handed over by Martin Oehry.

References

External links

1994 births
Living people
HC Ambrì-Piotta players
Finnish ice hockey goaltenders
HC TWK Innsbruck players
Jokerit players
KooKoo players
Leksands IF players
Mora IK players
Nashville Predators draft picks
Lahti Pelicans players
Peliitat Heinola players
People from Kiihtelysvaara
Sportspeople from North Karelia